The Subcommittee on Intelligence and Special Operations is a subcommittee of the House Armed Services Committee in the U.S. House of Representatives. During the 112th Congress, it was known as the Subcommittee on Emerging Threats and Capabilities, and before that as the Subcommittee on Terrorism, Unconventional Threats and Capabilities. From the 113th–116th Congresses it was named the Subcommittee on Intelligence, Emerging Threats and Capabilities

It is currently Chaired by Democrat Ruben Gallego of Arizona and its Ranking Member is Trent Kelly of Mississippi.

Jurisdiction
The Subcommittee on Intelligence and Special Operations has jurisdiction over Department of Defense policy, programs, and accounts related to military intelligence, national intelligence, countering weapons of mass destruction, counter-proliferation, counter-terrorism, intelligence support and cyber operations, strategic communications, information operations, and other sensitive military operations. Additionally, the subcommittee has oversight over Special Operations Forces as well defense science and technology policy and programs, such as the Defense Advanced Research Projects Agency.

Members, 117th Congress
Membership for the 117th Congress is below.

Historical membership rosters

115th Congress

116th Congress

See also
United States Senate Armed Services Subcommittee on Emerging Threats and Capabilities

External links
House Armed Services Committee
Subcommittee page

References

Armed Services Emerging Threats and Capabilities